The term cat lady can refer to several things:

 Cat lady, a woman who dotes upon her cat or cats. The term is commonly used in a pejorative sense to denote an animal hoarder who keeps large numbers of cats without having the ability to properly house or care for them.

Fictional characters
 Eleanor Abernathy (Crazy Cat Lady), a fictional character from the animated television series The Simpsons
 Crazy Old Cat Lady, a fictional character from the animated television series Codename: Kids Next Door
 Catwoman, a fictional character from DC Comics (most often Batman titles)

Video games
 The Cat Lady, a 2012 horror adventure video game